In Greek mythology, the name Anthus (Ancient Greek: Ἄνθος, Anthos means 'flower, bloom or blosso') may refer to:

Anthus, a son of Autonous and Hippodamia. His brothers were Erodius, Schoeneus and Acanthus, and his sister was Acanthis. Once he drove his father's horses away from the grassy meadows, where they had been pastured by his brother Erodius. Out of hunger, the horses attacked Anthus and devoured him; his father was in shock and could not help, while his mother tried to save him but failed because of her physical weakness. Zeus and Apollo, out of pity for the grieving family, transformed the members into birds. Anthus himself was metamorphosed into a bird called "anthus" which imitated the neighing of a horse, but always fled from the sight of a horse. His servant, who failed to protect the master, was transformed into a white heron. The bird genus Anthus is thus named after him.
Anthus of Anthedon, who went missing when he was a child. His sister Hypera set out to search for him and eventually was received as guest by Acastus of Pherae, in whose household Anthus had ended up serving as a cup-bearer. As Anthus came up to his sister to serve her wine, he recognized her and whispered a rhyme to her: "Drink wine with lees, 'cause you dwell not in Anthedon". The same poetic line was otherwise said to be part of an oracular prophecy. Certain companions of Anthus and Hypera were said to have settled in the island Calauria (previously known as Eirene, after Eirene) and to have called it Anthedonia and Hypereia.

Notes

References 

 Antoninus Liberalis, The Metamorphoses of Antoninus Liberalis translated by Francis Celoria (Routledge 1992). Online version at the Topos Text Project.
 Lucius Mestrius Plutarchus, Moralia with an English Translation by Frank Cole Babbitt. Cambridge, MA. Harvard University Press. London. William Heinemann Ltd. 1936. Online version at the Perseus Digital Library. Greek text available from the same website.
 Pliny the Elder, The Natural History. John Bostock, M.D., F.R.S. H.T. Riley, Esq., B.A. London. Taylor and Francis, Red Lion Court, Fleet Street. 1855. Online version at the Perseus Digital Library.
 Pliny the Elder, Naturalis Historia. Karl Friedrich Theodor Mayhoff. Lipsiae. Teubner. 1906. Latin text available at the Perseus Digital Library.

Metamorphoses into birds in Greek mythology
Deeds of Zeus